The 2023 FIBA 3x3 Asia Cup is the sixth edition of the FIBA 3x3 Asia Cup. There are 80 games being played this year, with half in the qualification draw and the other half in the main draw.The men and women's champions will win a spot at one of the qualifying tournaments for the 2024 Paris Olympics.It is estimated that there with be over 5,000 spectators viewing the game, which is located at the Singapore Sports Hub OCBC Square, with tickets costing $5.

Men's

Women's

See also 
 FIBA
 FIBA Asia

References

External links
 FIBA 3x3 Asia Cup 2023

International basketball competitions hosted by Singapore
Asia Cup
FIBA Asia 3x3 Cup
FIBA
FIBA
FIBA
FIBA